Luis Prendes Estrada (22 August 1913 – 27 October 1998) was a Spanish actor. He was considered one of the country's most famous movie star during the 1940s and 1950s. He was also an important figure in the country's theatre.

Selected filmography

 Corner in Madrid (1936) - Mario
 Fortuna (1940)
 Heart of Gold (1941) - Agustín
 Una conquista difícil (1942)
 La madre guapa (1942)
 La culpa del otro (1942) - Juan Carlos
 Su excelencia el mayordomo (1942) - Alfredo
 Melodías prohibidas (1942)
 Boda accidentada (1943) - Nico
 Mi adorable secretaria (1943) - Miguel
 Rosas de otoño (1943)
 Una chica de opereta (1944) - Armando d'Olbés
 Mi enemigo y yo (1944) - Mauricio de Viera
 Lola Montes (1944) - Carlos Benjumea
 Tambor y cascabel (1944)
 Estaba escrito (1945)
 Gentleman Thief (1946) - Jaime Borrell
 Four Women (1947) - enamorado de Elena
 La manigua sin dios (1949)
 Una noche en blanco (1949) - Álvaro
 Cita con mi viejo corazón (1950)
 El duende y el rey (1950)
 La sombra iluminada (1950) - Daniel
 Séptima página (1950) - Manolo
 Reckless (1951) - Fernando Mendoza
 Black Sky (1951) - Ricardo Fortuny
 Devil's Roundup (1952) - Buhonero
 The Devil Plays the Flute (1953) - Bernaldino
 Condemned to Hang (1953) - Tomás
 Luces de candilejas (1956)
 Dos basuras (1958)
 Venta de Vargas (1959) - Comandante De Moulin
 Back to the Door (1959) - Enrique Simón
 El precio de la sangre (1960)
 El príncipe encadenado (1960)
 Ursus (1961) - Setas
 King of Kings (1961) - as Dismas, the Penitent Thief
 Kill and Be Killed (1962) - Inspector Muñoz
 Todos eran culpables (1962)
 Plaza de oriente (1963) - Gabriel Ardanaz
 Carta a una mujer (1963) - Augusto
 Los muertos no perdonan (1963) - Pablo Laínez
 Pyro... The Thing Without a Face (1964) - Police Inspector
 La hora incógnita (1964) - Policía
 Loca juventud (1965) - Carlos Durán, padre de Johnny
 100.000 dollari per Lassiter (1966) - Mack (uncredited)
 Seven Vengeful Women (1966) - Pope
 Fantasia 3 (1966) - Mago de Oz (segment "El mago de Oz")
 El fantástico mundo del doctor Coppelius (1966) - The Mayor
 Django Does Not Forgive (1966)
 El hombre que mató a Billy el Niño (1967) - John Tunstill
 El dedo del destino (1967) - Winkle
 The Christmas Kid (1967) - Judge George Perkins
 Un homme à abattre (1967) - Julius
 White Comanche (1968) - Grimes
 La banda del Pecas (1968) - Padre de Marina
 Investigación criminal (1970) - Inspector Basilio Lérida
 Chino (1973) - (uncredited)
 Un hombre como los demás (1974)
 Hay que matar a B. (1974) - Commisary
 Breakout (1975) - Juez (uncredited)
 El juego del diablo (1975) - Alcalde / Town Mayor
 Secuestro (1976) - Óscar
 Cazar un gato negro (1977) - Doctor
 China 9, Liberty 37 (1978) - Williams
 Jaguar Lives! (1979) - Habish
 Tuareg – The Desert Warrior (1984) - Abdul El Kabir
 Memorias del general Escobar (1984) - General Aranguren
 Alfonso X y el Reino de Murcia (1985) - Alfonso X
 The Falling (1985) - Dr. W. Tracer, NASA
 La Gran Fiesta (1986) - Don Manuel González
 Loco veneno (1989) - Sr. Sadurny
 Atilano presidente (1998) - Don Aníbal

References

External links

1913 births
1998 deaths
Spanish male film actors
Spanish male stage actors
Spanish male television actors
20th-century Spanish male actors
Deaths from cancer in Spain
People from Melilla